Pathalam is a suburban region of the city of Kochi, in the state of Kerala, India. It is situated close to Eloor, an industrial district of Kochi. In the state bureaucratic administration, Pathalam is part of the Paravur Taluk in the District of Ernakulam. Pathalam Junction is a four-way junction having access to places like Kalamassery NH47 (2 km away), Eloor(1 km), N.Paravur (14 km away).  There is an ESI hospital in Pathalam.

See also
North Paravur
Ernakulam District

References 

Villages in Ernakulam district
Suburbs of Kochi